Walt Disney's Funny Factory is a series of DVDs by Walt Disney Home Entertainment. Very similar to the  Walt Disney's Classic Cartoon Favorites line, each release would feature around one-hour of Disney animated short films, grouped by a starring character, or set of characters. As opposed to the chronological nature of the Walt Disney Treasures line, each release would feature various cartoons in no particular order. The series featured two waves of releases, on January 17, 2006, and November 21, 2006.

Releases

Wave One
The first wave of two releases came on January 17, 2006.

Volume 1: With Mickey
All of the shorts on here feature Mickey Mouse.
Mickey and the Seal (1948) (1954 in Canada)
Mr. Mouse Takes a Trip (1940) (1946 in Canada)
Moose Hunters (1937) (1943 in Canada)
Mickey's Parrot (1938) (1944 in Canada)
The Pointer (1939) (1945 in Canada)
Magician Mickey (1937) (1943 in Canada)
Tugboat Mickey (1940) (1946 in Canada)
R'coon Dawg (1951) (1957 in Canada)

Volume 2: With Donald
All of the shorts on here feature Donald Duck.
Canvas Back Duck (1953) (1959 in Canada)
Donald's Cousin Gus (1939) (1945 in Canada)
Daddy Duck (1948) (1954 in Canada)
Window Cleaners (1940) (1946 in Canada)
Self Control (1938) (1944 in Canada)
Contrary Condor (1944) (1950 in Canada)
Donald's Golf Game (1938) (1944 in Canada)

Wave Two
The second wave of five releases came on November 21, 2006.

Volume 3: With Goofy
All of the shorts on here feature Goofy.
Goofy and Wilbur (1939) (1945 in Canada)
Clock Cleaners (1937) (1943 in Canada)
Goofy's Glider (1940) (1946 in Canada)
Man's Best Friend (1952) (1958 in Canada)
Father's Week End (1953) (1959 in Canada)
Father's Lion (1952) (1958 in Canada)
Aquamania (1961) (1967 in Canada)

Volume 4: With Huey, Dewey & Louie
All of the shorts on here feature Donald Duck and Huey, Dewey, and Louie.
Donald's Nephews (1938) (1944 in Canada)
Straight Shooters (1947) (1953 in Canada)
Sea Scouts (1939) (1945 in Canada)
Donald's Off Day (1944) (1950 in Canada)
Lion Around (1950) (1956 in Canada)
Soup's On (1948) (1954 in Canada)
Don's Fountain of Youth (1953) (1959 in Canada)
Lucky Number (1951) (1957 in Canada)

External links 
 

Short film compilations
Home video lines
Disney home video releases
Disney-related lists